Fasciculus lateralis may refer to:

 Lateral cord (fasciculus lateralis plexus brachialis)
 Lateral proper fasciculus (fasciculus lateralis proprius)
 Lateral corticospinal tract (fasciculus cerebrospinalis lateralis)